Glasgow is a census-designated place (CDP) in New Castle County, Delaware, United States. The population was 14,303 at the 2010 census.

History
La Grange and the James Stewart House are listed on the National Register of Historic Places.

Geography
Glasgow is located at  (39.6048338, -75.7452119).

Demographics

As of the census of 2000, there were 12,840 people, 4,517 households, and 3,478 families living in the CDP. The racial makeup of the CDP was 77.98% White, 17.02% African American, 0.22% Native American, 2.33% Asian, 0.02% Pacific Islander, 1.06% from other races, and 1.37% from two or more races. Hispanic or Latino of any race were 3.01% of the population.

There were 4,517 households, out of which 44.5% had children under the age of 18 living with them, 62.9% were married couples living together, 10.7% had a female householder with no husband present, and 23.0% were non-families. 16.0% of all households were made up of individuals, and 2.0% had someone living alone who was 65 years of age or older.  The average household size was 2.84 and the average family size was 3.22.

In the CDP, the population was spread out, with 29.3% under the age of 18, 8.5% from 18 to 24, 37.9% from 25 to 44, 20.2% from 45 to 64, and 4.2% who were 65 years of age or older.  The median age was 31 years. For every 100 females, there were 98.0 males.  For every 100 females age 18 and over, there were 93.2 males.

The median income for a household in the CDP was $61,707, and the median income for a family was $67,252. Males had a median income of $42,788 versus $33,183 for females. The per capita income for the CDP was $24,795.  About 2.5% of families and 3.9% of the population were below the poverty line, including 5.2% of those under age 18 and none of those age 65 or over.

Education
Most of Glasgow is part of the Christina School District while a small portion is in the Appoquinimink School District.

The Christina district section is divided between Brader, Keene, and West Park elementary schools. The Christina district section is zoned to Gauger/Cobbs Middle School, and Glasgow High School.

Hodgson Vo-Tech High School of the New Castle County Vocational-Technical School District is in Glasgow.

References

External links

 Glasgow Pines Web Site

Census-designated places in New Castle County, Delaware
Census-designated places in Delaware